The 2012–13 Coventry Blaze season is the 10th season for the Coventry Blaze in the British Elite Ice Hockey League (EIHL).

Player roster and transfers 2012–13

Player roster
The Coventry Blaze roster for the 2012–13 season.

Two-way players
Players on a two-way contract with Coventry Blaze for the 2012–13 season (includes players called up for injury cover during the season).

Player transfers
Players leaving and joining the club for the 2012–13 season.

*signed for the duration of the 2012 NHL lock-out

Fixtures and results 2012–13

Elite Ice Hockey League

 Green background indicates win (2 points)
 Yellow background indicates overtime/shootout loss (1 point)
 Red background indicates regulation loss (0 points)

Challenge Cup

 Green background indicates win (2 points)
 Yellow background indicates overtime/shootout loss (1 point)
 Red background indicates regulation loss (0 points)

Pre-season & challenge games
 Green background indicates win.
 Red background indicates loss.
 White background indicates tied game.

Playoffs

The top 4 teams from each conference of the Elite Ice Hockey League standings will qualify for the quarterfinals of the play-offs.

The winners of each match-up will progress to the play-off finals weekend, to take place in Nottingham on 6 and 7 April 2013.

References

Coventry Blaze
Coventry Blaze seasons